Ryan Overland (born October 25, 1985) is an American baseball coach and former catcher, who is the current interim head baseball coach of the Fresno State Bulldogs. He played college baseball at Fresno State from 2005 to 2008.

Coaching career
On January 15, 2023, Overland was named the interim head coach of the Fresno State Bulldogs.

Head coaching record

References

Living people
1985 births
Fresno State Bulldogs baseball coaches
Fresno State Bulldogs baseball players
Nevada Wolf Pack baseball coaches
South Dakota State Jackrabbits baseball coaches